Francis Leo Marcos (September 29, 1979, Baguio, Philippines, also known as FLM) is a Filipino businessman, philanthropist and internet personality. He is known for popularizing the Mayaman Challenge social media trend and his 2022 Senate election bid.

Background
According to his own account, Marcos started his philanthropy in 2007 and for a long time did not benefit from social media publicity. He runs the Optimum Eye Care Program, which aims to provide eyeglasses to people unable to afford them.

Marcos came to wider public attention when he started a trend on Facebook called the "Mayaman Challenge" urging the rich to make a donation to people affected by the enhanced community quarantine imposed amidst the COVID-19 pandemic. Marcos posted a video about the challenge on Facebook which garnered 9 million views before it was taken down. He then created his own YouTube channel for the challenge.

Legal issues
Marcos is facing multiple charges against him. He has maintained that he is innocent and the charges against him are motivated by people who took offense to his Mayaman Challenge.

In 2020, Marcos was arrested by the National Bureau of Investigation (NBI). for violating Revised Optometry Law of 1995 by distributing eyeglasses for his eyecare program allegedly without the sanction of the Philippine Association of Optometry. Marcos believes that the action made against him constitute persecution also denying the child trafficking charges filed against him by the NBI in 2006 for recruiting children.

Political career
Marcos attempted to run for Senator in the 2013 elections but his candidacy was rejected since he was two years short of fulfilling the 35 years of age requirement to run for the position.

He ran again in the 2022 elections. This is despite a petition to declare him as a nuisance candidate. The Commission on Elections ruled that his candidacy is valid due and that he is capable of launching a campaign given the size of social media following he has already garnered at the time. However, he lost with only over 4.5 million votes, placing 27th and short of the 12 seats up for election.

Personal life
Marcos was born on September 29, 1979. There are conflicting information regarding his birthplace. He is reportedly born in Baguio or in Bulakan, Bulacan He goes by the full name of Francis Leo Antonio Marcos. He claims to be associated with the Marcos political family which had President Ferdinand Marcos as its member.

Marcos accounts that his mother revealed to him that he is related to the Marcoses at age 17. Imelda Marcos, the former First Lady, refuted the claim in 2020 stating that Francis Leo Marcos is not connected in any way to her family. According to the NBI, his real name is Norman Mangusin.

He is married to Mayu Murakami.

References

1979 births
Living people
Filipino philanthropists
Filipino Internet celebrities